The Mi Plan Tour was the fourth concert tour by Canadian singer-songwriter Nelly Furtado. The tour supported her fourth studio album, Mi Plan (2009). Since the album was recorded in Spanish, the tour primarily focused on hispanophone countries in the Americas. Dates in Europe and Asia were scheduled as well.

Background
The tour was announced on January 5, 2010 via Furtado's official website. For the tour, Furtado asked her fans for help choosing the setlist, asking which songs should be on the show.

The concert in Santiago was one of the first after the 2010 Chile earthquake that happened 3 weeks before. Nelly Furtado donated 5% of the revenues to the people affected by the catastrophe. To promote the tour in Brazil on March 24, 2010, Furtado made a "VIP Pocket Show" appearance in the reality show program Big Brother Brasil 10 from Rede Globo, the country's leading channel. She performed 5 songs from the tour in acoustic versions ("Maneater", "I'm Like a Bird", "Try", "Say It Right" and "Turn Off The Light").

Set list
"Maneater"
"Força"
"Bajo Otra Luz"
"Shit on the Radio (Remember the Days)"
"I'm like a Bird"
"My Love Grows Deeper (Part 1)" / "I Will Make U Cry" / "Legend" / "Baby Girl" / "Party's Just Begun (Again)"
"Más"
"Try"
"Fotografía" / "Te Busqué" / "Sexy Movimiento" / "No Hay Igual"
"Fuerte"
"Turn Off the Light"
"All Good Things (Come to an End)"
"Powerless (Say What You Want)" (contains excerpts from "Land of Confusion")
"Manos al Aire"
"Do It"
"Give It to Me" / "Morning After Dark" / "Jump"

Encore
"Who Wants to Be Alone"
"Say It Right"

Source:

Notes
During her concert at the Ravinia Pavilion in Highland Park, Illinois, Furtado performed "Time Stand Still" by Rush instead of performing "Girlfriend in the City".

Tour dates

Festivals and other miscellaneous performances

This concert was a part of Reventon Super Estrella 2010
This concert was a part of Orange Warsaw Festival
This concert was a part of Ravinia Festival
This concert was a part of Terra Music Fest
This concert was a part of Noche de estrellas de Fidelity
This concert was a part of Yas Show Weekends

References

Nelly Furtado concert tours
2010 concert tours